A near miss, near hit or close call is an unplanned event that has the potential to cause, but does not actually result in human injury, environmental or equipment damage, or an interruption to normal operation.

OSHA defines a near miss as an incident in which no property was damaged and no personal injury was sustained, but where, given a slight shift in time or position, damage or injury easily could have occurred. Near misses also may be referred to as near accidents, accident precursors, injury-free events and, in the case of moving objects, near collisions.
A near miss is often an error, with harm prevented by other considerations and circumstances.

Causes
There are factors for a near miss related to the operator, and factors related to the context. Fatigue is an example for the former. The risk of a car crash after a more than 24h shift for physicians has been observed to increase by 168%, and the risk of near miss by 460%.
Factors relating to the context include time pressures, unfamiliar settings, and in the case of health care, diverse patients, and high patient-to-nurse staffing ratios.

Reporting, analysis and prevention

Most safety activities are reactive and not proactive. Many organizations wait for losses to occur before taking steps to prevent a recurrence. Near miss incidents often precede loss producing events but are largely ignored because nothing (no injury, damage or loss) happened. Employees are not enlightened to report these close calls as there has been no disruption or loss in the form of injuries or property damage. Thus, many opportunities to prevent the accidents that the organization has not yet had are lost. Recognizing and reporting near miss incidents can make a major difference to the safety of workers within organizations. In the heavy construction industry, near miss reporting software allows crews to find and document opportunities that help reduce safety risks as the software tracks, analyzes and calls attention to near misses on the job site to help prevent future incidents. History has shown repeatedly that most loss producing events (accidents) were preceded by warnings or near accidents, sometimes also called close calls, narrow escapes or near hits.

In terms of human lives and property damage, near misses are cheaper, zero-cost learning opportunities (compared to learning from actual injury or property loss events)

Getting a very high number of near misses is the goal as long as that number is within the organization's ability to respond and investigate - otherwise it is merely a paperwork exercise and a waste of time; it is possible to achieve a ratio of 100 near misses reported per loss event.

Achieving and investigating a high ratio of near misses will find the causal factors and root causes of potential future accidents, resulting in about 95% reduction in actual losses.

An ideal near miss event reporting system includes both mandatory (for incidents with high loss potential) and voluntary, non-punitive reporting by witnesses. A key to any near miss report is the "lesson learned". Near miss reporters can describe what they observed of the beginning of the event, and the factors that prevented loss from occurring.

The events that caused the near miss are subjected to root cause analysis to identify the defect in the system that resulted in the error and factors that may either amplify or ameliorate the result.

To prevent the near miss from happening again, the organization must institute teamwork training, feedback on performance and a commitment to continued data collection and analysis, a process called continuous improvement.

Near misses are smaller in scale, relatively simpler to analyze and easier to resolve. Thus, capturing near misses not only provides an inexpensive means of learning, but also has some equally beneficial spin offs:
 Captures sufficient data for statistical analysis; trending studies.
 Provides immense opportunity for "employee participation," a basic requirement for a successful workplace health and safety program. This embodies principles of behavior shift, responsibility sharing, awareness, and incentives.
 One of the primary workplace problems near miss incident reporting attempts to solve directly or indirectly is to try to create an open culture whereby everyone shares and contributes in a responsible manner. Near-Miss reporting has been shown to increase employee relationships and encourage teamwork in creating a safer work environment.

Safety improvements by reports
Reporting of near misses by observers is an established error reduction technique in many industries and organizations:

Aviation
In the United States, the Aviation Safety Reporting System (ASRS) has been collecting confidential voluntary reports of close calls from pilots, flight attendants, air traffic controllers since 1976. The system was established after TWA Flight 514 crashed on approach to Dulles International Airport near Washington, D.C., killing all 85 passengers and seven crew in 1974. The investigation that followed found that the pilot misunderstood an ambiguous response from the Dulles air traffic controllers, and that earlier another airline had told its pilots, but not other airlines, about a similar near miss. The ASRS identifies deficiencies and provides data for planning improvements to stakeholders without regulatory action. Some familiar safety rules, such as turning off electronic devices that can interfere with navigation equipment, are a result of this program. Due to near miss observations and other technological improvements, the rate of fatal accidents has dropped about 65 percent, to one fatal accident in about 4.5 million departures, from one in nearly 2 million in 1997.

In the United Kingdom, an aviation near miss report is known as an "airprox", an air proximity hazard, by the Civil Aviation Authority. Since reporting began, aircraft near misses continue to decline.

Fire-rescue services
The rate of fire fighter fatalities and injuries in the United States is unchanged for the last 15 years despite improvements in personal protective equipment, apparatus and a decrease in structure fires. In 2005, the National Fire Fighter Near-Miss Reporting System was established, funded by grants from the U.S. Fire Administration and Fireman’s Fund Insurance Company, and endorsed by the International Associations of Fire Chiefs and Fire Fighters. Any member of the fire service community is encouraged to submit a report when he/she is involved in, witnesses, or is told of a near-miss event. The report may be anonymous, and is not forwarded to any regulatory agency.

Law enforcement and public safety 
A total of 1,439 U.S. law enforcement officers died in the line of duty during the past 10 years, an average of one death every 61 hours or 144 per year. There were 123 law enforcement officers killed in the line of duty in 2015. In 2014, the Law Enforcement Officer (LEO) Near Miss Reporting System was established, with funding support from the U.S. Department of Justice's Office of Community Oriented Policing Services (COPS Office).  Since its launch, the LEO Near Miss system has established endorsements and partnerships with the National Law Enforcement Officers' Memorial Fund (NLEOMF), the International Association of Chiefs of Police (IACP), the International Association of Directors of Law Enforcement Standards and Training (IADLEST), the Officer Down Memorial Page (ODMP) and the Below 100 organization. The Police Foundation, a national, independent non-profit organization, operates the system and has received additional support from the Motorola Solutions Foundation. Law enforcement members are to submit voluntary reports when involved in or having witnessed or become aware of a near-miss event. Near miss reports take minutes to submit, can be submitted anonymously and are not forwarded to regulatory or investigative agencies, but are used to provide analysis, policy and training recommendations to the law enforcement community.

Healthcare
AORN, a US-based professional organization of perioperative registered nurses, has put in effect a voluntary near miss reporting system  called SafetyNet covering medication or transfusion reactions, communication or consent issues, wrong patient or procedures, communication breakdown or technology malfunctions. An analysis of incidents allows safety alerts to be issued to AORN members.

The United States Department of Veterans Affairs (VA) and the National Aeronautics and Space Administration (NASA) developed the Patient Safety Reporting System modeled upon the Aviation Safety Reporting System to monitor patient safety through voluntary, confidential reports.

Rail
CIRAS (the Confidential Incident Reporting and Analysis System) is a confidential reporting system modelled upon ASRS and originally developed by the University of Strathclyde for use in the Scottish rail industry. However, after the Ladbroke Grove rail crash, John Prescott mandated its use throughout the whole UK rail industry. Since 2006 CIRAS has been run by an autonomous Charitable trust.

See also 
 , example of a nuclear close call

References

External links
Columbia Journalism Review:‘Near Miss’

Safety
Error